Nikita Borisov is a cryptographer and computer security researcher, currently an associate professor at the University of Illinois at Urbana-Champaign (UIUC). His notable work includes one of the first cryptanalyses of the WEP wireless encryption protocol together with Ian Goldberg and David Wagner, and the design of the Off-the-Record Messaging protocol with Goldberg.

Borisov received a B. Math in computer science and pure math in 1997 from the University of Waterloo. He received an M.S. and a Ph.D. in computer science from the University of California, Berkeley in 2002 and 2005, respectively.

References

External links
nikita Nikita Borisov's page at UIUC

Living people
20th-century births
Modern cryptographers
Cypherpunks
Computer security academics
UC Berkeley College of Engineering alumni
University of Illinois Urbana-Champaign faculty
Year of birth missing (living people)